Hasbergen is a railway station located in Hasbergen, Germany.

History

The station is located on the Wanne-Eickel–Hamburg railway line. The train services are operated by WestfalenBahn.

Train services
The following services currently call at Hasbergen:

Railway stations in Lower Saxony